= Mariusz Markiewicz =

Polish historian (1957–2018)

- Born: 1957
- Died: 29 March 2018
- Occupation: Historian

Mariusz Paweł Markiewicz (1957–29 March 2018) was a historian, professor at the Jagiellonian University.

== Biography ==
He obtained habilitation in 1992. In 1997 he was elected a correspondent fellow of the Royal Historical Society. He supervised nine doctoral dissertations. From 1993 until 1999 he was director of the Institute of History of the Jagiellonian University. He was buried at the Batowice Cemetery.

== Works ==
- Rady senatorskie Augusta II: (1697–1733). Wrocław. 1988.
- Polityka gospodarcza i społeczna Privy Council w latach panowania Karola II 1660–1685: administracja wobec kryzysu merkantylizmu. Kraków. 1990.
- Historia Polski (1492–1795). Kraków. 2004.
